Namibia competed at the 2016 Summer Olympics in Rio de Janeiro, Brazil, from 5 to 21 August 2016. This was the nation's seventh consecutive appearance at the Summer Olympics.

Namibian National Olympic Committee sent a team of 10 athletes, 4 men and 6 women, to compete in track and field, boxing, road cycling, mountain biking, and shooting at the Olympics, matching the nation's roster size with Beijing 2008. The Namibian roster featured four returning Olympians; two of them attended their third straight Games, including marathon runner Beata Naigambo and Africa's top-seeded trap shooter Gaby Ahrens. Meanwhile, amateur light welterweight boxer Jonas Junias, the youngest of the team (aged 22), was chosen to be Namibia's flag bearer in the opening ceremony.

Namibia, however, failed to win a single Olympic medal since the 1996 Summer Olympics in Atlanta, where sprinter Frankie Fredericks collected two silvers each in both the men's 100 and 200 metres.

Athletics (track and field)
 
Namibian athletes have so far achieved qualifying standards in the following athletics events (up to a maximum of 3 athletes in each event):

Track & road events

Boxing

Namibia has entered two boxers to compete in the following weight classes into the Olympic boxing tournament. Mathias Hamunyela and Jonas Junias had claimed their Olympic spots at the 2016 African Qualification Tournament in Yaoundé, Cameroon.

Cycling

Road
Namibia has qualified one rider in the men's Olympic road race by virtue of his individual ranking among the next two best ranked NOCs at the 2015 African Championships. One female rider has been added to the Namibian squad to compete in the women's Olympic road race by finishing first at the 2016 African Championships.

Mountain biking
Namibia has qualified one mountain biker in the women's Olympic cross-country race by virtue of her top individual ranking at the 2015 African Championships.

Shooting

Namibia has qualified one shooter in the women's trap by securing one of the available Olympic berths at the 2015 Africa Continental Championships in Cairo, Egypt.

See also
Namibia at the 2016 Summer Paralympics

References

External links 
 

Nations at the 2016 Summer Olympics
2016
Olympics